Scarlet Innocence is a 2014 South Korean thriller co-written and directed by Yim Pil-sung, starring Jung Woo-sung and Esom. It is a modern-day retelling of the classic Korean folktale Simcheongga.

Plot
After getting caught in a sex scandal, literature professor Shim Hak-kyu (Jung Woo-sung) is forced to leave Seoul to teach in a small, rural town, until the matter is settled, leaving his depressed wife (Yoon Se-ah) and daughter, Chung-ee (Park Seo-yeon). Hak-kyu becomes involved in a relationship with Deok-ee (Esom), a naive ticket seller for a soon-to-be-dismantled amusement park. Their relationship quickly spreads to the town residents and greatly disturbs Deok-ee's deaf mother (Kim Nam-jin). Eventually, Hak-kyu's name is cleared with the help of his friend, Dong-woo (Lee Chang-hoon), allowing him to teach at his university. Before he departs, Deok-ee reveals that their previous intimacy had made her pregnant. After aborting the baby, Hak-kyu leaves, promising to return for Deok-ee. Instead, he goes back home and gives respite to his miserable wife.

Though Hak-kyu is still going to the rural town for a while, he avoids Deok-ee, telling her to "wait". One night, Hak-kyu visits her home to bribe her into never speaking their relationship again for a sum of money. During the conflict, Deok-ee forgets to turn off the stove, which engulfs her house with her mother still inside. Receiving distressing calls from Chung-ee, Hak-kyu returns home to find that his wife has committed suicide.

Eight years later, Hak-kyu has become a successful writer, but is leading a wild lifestyle, including drinking, smoking, and gambling, becoming heavily indebted in the process. At the same time, he learns that an illness is threatening his vision. Chung-ee (Park So-young), meanwhile, is beginning to slip away and go to a club, where she meets Deok-ee, who has taken up the identity of "Yoon Se-jung" and is moving as the Shim's new neighbor. Deok-ee starts to frequently tend to the Shim as Hak-kyu spirals down due to his debt and his firing from his university, also recommending him an ophthalmologist (Yang Jin-woo), who only makes him blind. Eventually, the gambling boss, Mr. Choi (Kim Hee-won), forces Hak-kyu to sign a contract sending Chung-ee to Japan to work as a prostitute in return for a hefty sum of money. During Hak-kyu's period of mourning, Deok-ee reveals her identity and her anger to him, saying she will continue to make him suffer until he dies. She is also revealed to have learned Hak-kyu's location and condition from Dong-woo in favor of a sex with him.

However, Deok-ee is horrified when the now-experienced Chung-ee manages to return home. Chung-ee reveals that she already knows what Deok-ee had done to her family, including recommending the mock ophthalmologist, promising to return her revenge back to her. Through her client, a Japanese man (Shinjo Huta) who controls Mr. Choi's casino, Deok-ee's contract with Mr. Choi is concluded. Chung-ee then forces Deok-ee into a surgery (surgery conducted by the ophthalmologist after he was beaten), to give her eyes to her father. Before the operation, Hak-kyu apologizes to the tearful Deok-ee, telling her that he will make everything right for her and Chung-ee.

The film closes with the now blind Deok-ee sitting near a lake and grabbing her hand was Hak-kyu, who watches her and says "Deok-ee, I love you".

Cast

Jung Woo-sung as Shim Hak-kyu
Esom as Deok-yi 
Park So-young as Chung-yi
Kim Hee-won as Casino Mr. Choi
Kim Nam-jin as Deok-yi's mother
Lee Chang-hoon  as Dong-woo
Yang Jin-woo as Ophthalmologist
Shinjo Huta as Japanese chairman
Park Seo-yeon as young Chung-yi
Kim Ja-young as Mom-and-pop store owner
Yoo Soon-woong as Elder in novel writing class 1
Im Hyeong-tae as Elder in novel writing class 2
Eo Joo-seon as Elder in novel writing class 3
Lee Sang-hwa as Middle-aged man in novel writing class 
Han Joo-young as Ji-eun
Park Pal-young as University president
Park So-dam as Chung-yi's friend at the club
Cho Yoon-woo as Handsome guy at the club
Kim Do-yeon as Innkeeper
Son Suk-ku as Casino henchman 2
Yoon Se-ah as Chung-yi's mother (cameo)

Awards and nominations

References

External links
 
 

Films directed by Yim Pil-sung
South Korean romantic thriller films
South Korean erotic thriller films
2010s erotic thriller films
South Korean films about revenge
2014 films
CJ Entertainment films
2010s South Korean films